Running Man is a 2013 South Korean action film starring Shin Ha-kyun as an ordinary man who begins to be chased and watched by the entire nation after he is falsely accused in a homicide case.

Running Man was the first ever Korean movie to have 100% of its investment come from a Hollywood studio, 20th Century Fox, which also produced it along with CreaPictures. Distributed by Fox both domestically and worldwide, it was released in theaters on April 4, 2013.

Plot
Jong-Woo (Shin Ha-kyun) went to prison four times for petty crimes likes burglary and car theft, but he now works as an auto mechanic. He has a 17-year-old son named Gi-Hyuk (Lee Min-ho), which he raises by himself. Gi-Hyuk is a smart kid, but troubled. The father and the son also do not get along. Although Jong-Woo might appear like an irresponsible father, he tries his best and even works at night as a private taxi service.

One evening, Jong-Woo drops off a couple at a ritzy hotel. Suddenly, another man hops into Jong-Woo's car and tells him to drive off. Once the man pulls out a large stash of cash, Jong-Woo is happy to drive the man wherever he wants. The man asks Jong-Woo to drive him to a delivery company.

Jong-Woo walks into the delivery company and asks for directions to the bathroom. He then notices the man mailing off a small electronic device. The man then comes up to Jong-Woo and offers him $1,000 if he will drive him to an apartment and then to the airport. Jong-Woo happily agrees, but he first grabs the man's cellphone and calls his own cellphone.

Once they get into the parking garage of the apartment complex, Jong-Woo's life is about to turn completely upside down. He runs out of the garage on foot and becomes the prime suspect in a murder case.

Meanwhile, Gi-Hyuk is shocked and confused that his father is now a murder suspect. Gi-Hyuk attempts to uncover the truth.

Cast
Shin Ha-kyun - Cha Jong-woo, auto mechanic
Lee Tae-ri - Cha Gi-hyuk, Jong-woo's son (credit as Lee Min-ho)
Kim Sang-ho - Ahn Sang-ki, detective
Jo Eun-ji - Park Sun-young, reporter
Oh Jung-se - Jang Do-sik, computer geek
Joo Hyun - Pastor Moon
Kim Eui-sung - Director Kim
Jung Suk-yong - Chief of police
Nam Kyung-eup - Richard Ma
Won Woong-jae - Detective Choi
Jung Mi-seong - Reporter Choi
Kwon Beom-taek - Dr. Hong Seung-hoon
Park Sang-wook - Beard
Yeom Dong-heon - Drunk

Release
Running Man was released in South Korea on April 4, 2013. The film fell to third place in its second week, behind the premieres of Fists of Legend and Oblivion.

Critical reception
Film Business Asia gave the film a three out of ten rating, referring to it as an "over-played and under-written action marathon quickly wears out its welcome."

References

External links
  
 
 
 

2013 films
2013 action thriller films
South Korean action thriller films
Films set in Seoul
20th Century Fox films
2010s Korean-language films
2010s South Korean films